Pablo Orbaiz Lesaka (born 6 February 1979) is a Spanish former professional footballer who played as a defensive midfielder.

After starting out with Osasuna, he went on to play 11 years in La Liga with Athletic Bilbao, appearing in a total of 318 competitive matches and scoring 13 goals.

Club career

Osasuna / Athletic
Born in Pamplona, Orbaiz began his career at hometown's CA Osasuna, exclusively playing in the second division with the team and contributing with 29 appearances and one goal in his final season as the Navarrese returned to La Liga after a six-year absence.

After that he moved to neighbours Athletic Bilbao, where he was a very important midfield element from the start. In the 2004–05 campaign he played 35 league matches and scored three goals, adding eight appearances in the UEFA Cup. However, he also suffered very serious knee injuries in 2002–03 and 2006–07, only taking part in a combined 14 games.

In the 2009–10 season, Orbaiz continued to be an automatic first-choice when healthy. However, during one month (February–March 2010), he was sent off twice for dangerous challenges – both of which resulted in two-match bans – at Villarreal CF (2–1 loss) and at home against Getafe CF (2–2, he also scored the opener in the latter game). For the following campaign he was promoted as team captain, after the departures of Joseba Etxeberria and Francisco Yeste.

Later years
In late August 2011, after another season of regular use by manager Joaquín Caparrós – 26 games, 1,675 minutes – as Athletic once again qualified for the Europa League, 32-year-old Orbaiz was loaned to Olympiacos F.C. in Greece, joining a host of compatriots at the Piraeus club, including manager Ernesto Valverde. He won the domestic double and was able to realise his ambition to play in the UEFA Champions League, making four group stage appearances. 

Orbaiz was released by Bilbao afterwards, signing for one season with FC Rubin Kazan and reuniting with compatriot and former Olympiacos teammate Iván Marcano.

International career
Orbaiz made his debut with Spain on 21 August 2002 in a testimonial match for Ferenc Puskás against Hungary, representing the nation in a further three matches. Previously, he helped the under-20s win the 1999 FIFA World Youth Championship.

Honours

Club
Athletic Bilbao
Copa del Rey runner-up: 2008–09
Supercopa de España runner-up: 2009

Olympiacos
Superleague Greece: 2011–12
Greek Football Cup: 2011–12

International
Spain U20
FIFA World Youth Championship: 1999

References

External links
 
 
 
 
 
 

1979 births
Living people
Footballers from Pamplona
Spanish footballers
Association football midfielders
La Liga players
Segunda División players
Segunda División B players
Tercera División players
CA Osasuna B players
CA Osasuna players
Athletic Bilbao footballers
Super League Greece players
Olympiacos F.C. players
Russian Premier League players
FC Rubin Kazan players
Spain youth international footballers
Spain under-21 international footballers
Spain international footballers
Basque Country international footballers
Spanish expatriate footballers
Expatriate footballers in Greece
Expatriate footballers in Russia
Spanish expatriate sportspeople in Russia
Spanish expatriate sportspeople in Greece